The ASUS Tinker Board is a single-board computer launched by ASUS in early 2017. Its physical size and GPIO pinout are designed to be compatible with the second and third-generation Raspberry Pi models.  The first released board features 4K video, 2GB of onboard RAM, gigabit Ethernet and a Rockchip RK3288 processor running at 1.8 GHz.

Specifications

History
ASUS's intent to release a single-board computer was leaked shortly after CES 2017 on SlideShare.  ASUS originally planned for a late February 2017 release, but a UK vendor broke the embargo and began advertising and selling boards starting on 13 February 2017, before ASUS's marketing department was ready.  ASUS subsequently pulled the release; the Amazon sales page was changed to show a 13 March 2017 release date, but was later removed entirely. However, the Tinker Board again became available on Amazon. ASUS assured reviewer websites that the board is now in full production.

Benchmarks
In January 2017 tests showed the Tinker Board has roughly twice the processing power of the Raspberry Pi Model 3 when the Pi 3 runs in 32-bit mode.  Because the Pi 3 has not released a 64-bit operating system yet, no comparisons are available against a Pi 3 running in 64-bit mode.

In March 2017 benchmark testing found that while the WLAN performance is only around 30Mbit/s, the gigabit ethernet delivers a full 950Mbit/s throughput.  RAM access tested using the mbw benchmark is 25% faster than the Pi 3. SD card (microSD) access is about twice as fast at 37MiB/s for buffered reads (compared to typically around 18MiB/s for the Pi 3) due to the Tinker Board's SDIO 3.0 interface, while cached reads can reach speeds up to 770MiB/s.

References

External links
 ASUS Tinker board product page
 Official support page for kernel and OS distribution download
ASUS Tinker Board site

Asus products
Single-board computers